Luca Maria Gambardella (born 4 January 1962) is an Italian computer scientist and author. He is the former director of the Dalle Molle Institute for Artificial Intelligence Research in Manno, in the Ticino canton of Switzerland.

With Marco Dorigo and others, he has published papers on the application of ant colony optimization theory to the traveling salesman problem and similar questions. Several of his papers have been extensively cited.

Beside working in research, Gambardella is also a novelist. The genres he approached broad from Bildungsroman of his first book "Sei vite" ("Six lives"), to romance of his second book "Il suono dell'alba" ("The sound of sunrise").

References 

Gambardella
Gambardella
Machine learning researchers
Academic staff of the University of Lugano